Gözlühüyük, historically Kemezanlı, is a village in the Nurdağı District, Gaziantep Province, Turkey. The village is populated by Kurds and had a population of 311 in 2022.

References

Villages in Nurdağı District
Kurdish settlements in Gaziantep Province